Daniel 'Dani' Provencio Azcune (born 7 October 1987) is a Spanish footballer who plays as for CDC Moscardó as a midfielder.

Club career
Born in Madrid, Provencio played youth football for local clubs Real Madrid, DAV Santa Ana and CDC Moscardó, making his senior debut with the latter in the 2006–07 season. In 2008 he signed with Rayo Vallecano, being initially assigned to the reserves in Tercera División.

On 10 April 2010, Provencio made his first official appearance with the main squad, coming on as an injury-time substitute in a 3–2 home win against UD Las Palmas in the Segunda División. He finished his first year with only three appearances, and in the second added a further seven, again all from the bench.

In the summer of 2011, Provencio left Rayo and signed with Getafe CF, again starting playing with the B side but now in Segunda División B. A year later he joined another reserve team, Atlético Levante UD.

Provencio was released by the Valencians in June 2013. Two months later, he moved to CE L'Hospitalet of the same league.

On 12 July 2014, Provencio moved abroad for the first time in his career, joining Romanian club CFR Cluj. However, on 28 August he returned to his native country, signing for CD Mirandés.

On 12 January 2016, Provencio scored twice in a 3–0 away victory over Deportivo de La Coruña in the Copa del Rey, which meant qualification to the quarter-finals 4–1 on aggregate. In the 2017 off-season he moved to third-tier Elche CF, who loaned him to UD Ibiza on 30 January 2019.

References

External links

1987 births
Living people
Spanish footballers
Footballers from Madrid
Association football midfielders
Segunda División players
Segunda División B players
Tercera División players
Tercera Federación players
Rayo Vallecano B players
Rayo Vallecano players
Getafe CF B players
Atlético Levante UD players
CE L'Hospitalet players
CD Mirandés footballers
Elche CF players
UD Ibiza players
Lleida Esportiu footballers
Las Rozas CF players
CFR Cluj players
Spanish expatriate footballers
Expatriate footballers in Romania
Spanish expatriate sportspeople in Romania